Roseland is an unincorporated community in Henry County, in the U.S. state of Missouri.

History
A post office called Roseland was established in 1894, and remained in operation until 1921. The community was named for the wild roses at a nearby schoolyard.

References

Unincorporated communities in Henry County, Missouri
Unincorporated communities in Missouri